The Sony Ericsson K850i is a high-end mobile phone when released in October 2007. It was announced in June 2007 as the flagship product in Sony Ericsson's K ("Kamera") series, with a 5 megapixel CMOS camera sensor. The K850 was the first Sony Ericsson phone released outside of NTT DoCoMo to support microSD and microSDHC along with Sony's traditional M2. It also introduces the usage of three touch-sensitive softkeys right under the display and a new form of navigation button, omitting the classic joystick introduced with the Ericsson T68. The camera interface has been revamped to resemble the format of cybershot digital cameras. According to the manufacturer the UMTS talk time has been significantly increased to 3 hours 30 min over its predecessor, the K800 and K810. (K800 2 hrs 30 min). It was Sony Ericsson's first 3.5G HSDPA supporting mobile phone, and was also the first 3G "global" mobile with supporting all major operating network frequency in the world including GSM 850, GSM 900, GSM 1800, GSM 1900, HSDPA, UMTS 850, UMTS 1900, UMTS 2100.

Design and features
The phone introduces a new button in the Cyber-shot line: on the right side a switch allows choosing between photo, video and playback mode.
The phone is available in the colours "Luminous Green", "Velvet Blue" and "Quicksilver Black".

Key features include:
 3G video calling
 Cyber-shot 5-megapixel camera with Xenon flash and additional 3 LED flash for video recording
 Bluetooth 2.0 (10 m)
 Web Access (NetFront browser included)
 Exchange ActiveSync
 3.5G high speed internet (Support up to 3.6 Mbit/s (download speed), 384 kbit/s (upload speed))
 Multiple audio playback (AAC, WAV, MP3, WMA)
 Built in Media Center (Sony PSP/PS3 XrossMediaBar menu)
 Video player with progressive fast forward and slow motion
 Memory Stick slot to expand the memory to up to 16 GB.

Camera Information
5.04 megapixel CMOS sensor, 16x digital zoom, natural color rendering, and built in xenon flash plus three additional LEDs for autofocusing and can be used for video recording. It also features Bestpic (Sony Ericsson's brand name for burst mode) which captures nine images in a row then you can choose the ones you want to save. In camera mode the keypad is differently lit so the user can easily find the camera shortcut buttons (Shoot mode, Scenes, Self-timer, Flash mode).

In common with the K810i and the K800, programs called Photo Fix, HP print and Face Warp are bundled with the K850i. Users can also easily increase the brightness and the contrast of the photo with PhotoFix and PhotoDJ.

Video recording is QVGA (320×240) at 30 frames per second. (K800 QCIF (176×144) @ 15 frame/s.) Supports Image and Video Stabilizer so videos and photos taken would be less likely to appear blurred and shaky. There have been major software problems in the past but now have been solved. Moreover, as in most Sony Ericsson phones, the camera software, called camdriver, can be modified to bring new features along with considerable improvement. The line of camdrivers known as Cybershot Xperience, developed by Hasaan Rafique (known online as Witchking) is the most promising as it implements many additional features like Manual Focus, Contrast, Saturation, Colour Balance, ISO, Shutter-speed and so on. It also allows the user to increase the video recording resolution.

Specifications
Screen
 2.2” QVGA (240×320 pixels), 262,144 (18-bit) colour TFT LCD
Available colours
 Luminous Green
 Velvet Blue
 Quicksilver Black

Sizes
 102 × 48 × 17 mm (4 × 1.9 × 0.7 in)
Weight
 
Memory
 Memory Stick Micro (M2) 512 MB in box (maximum capable – 16 GB),  a MicroSD card can also be used instead of the Memory Stick Micro card.
 Phone memory approximately 40 MB depending on the preconfiguration settings
Battery
 BST-38 3.6 V, 930 mAh, lithium polymer
 Talk time GSM/UMTS: Up to 9 h/3 h 30 min
 Standby time GSM/UMTS: Up to 400 h/350 h
 Video call time (K850): Up to 3 h 20 min

Variants
 K850i for international markets (UMTS / HSDPA tri band: UMTS 850, UMTS 1900, UMTS 2100; GSM / GPRS / EDGE quad band GSM 850, GSM 900, GSM 1800, GSM 1900)
 K858c for China (reduced to GSM/GPRS/EDGE 900/1800/1900, lack of front camera)

Firmware list
R1CA029 – First Release
R1CA037 (SEUS – 2007-12-03)
R1DA038 (SEUS – 2007-12-21)
R1DA039 (SEUS – 2007-12-21)
R1EA031 (SEUS – 2008-02-21)
R1EA037 (SEUS – 2008-04-12)
R1FA035 (SEUS – 2008-06-18)

SEUS – Sony Ericsson Update Service

See also
Other notable 5-megapixel phones of the time
Samsung G800
Samsung G600
LG Viewty
Nokia N95
Nokia N82

References

External links

 Press Release announcing K850 
 Official Specifications of K850 
 Official Website of Sony Ericsson Cybershot series mobile phones
 Official Specifications of K850 for developers

K850
K850
Mobile phones introduced in 2007